The Interactive Satellite for Art and Design Experimental Research or INVADER, also known as Cubesat Oscar 77 (CO-77) and Artsat-1 is an artificial satellite for artistic experiments in space. The satellite was built by the University of Tokyo in collaboration with Tama Art University. It has a size of 100x100x100mm (without antennas) and built around a standard 1U cubesat bus. The primary satellite payload is an FM voice transmitter. Also, it includes low-resolution CMOS camera and thermochromic panels for artistic purposes.

It was launched into orbit by a H-IIA launch vehicle on 27 February 2014 as a sub-payload of GPM Core satellite.
It reentered Earth's atmosphere on 2 September 2014.

See also

 List of CubeSats

References

External links
 Project site
 Gunters space Artsat-1 (invader) page

Spacecraft launched in 2014
Spacecraft which reentered in 2014
2014 in Japan
CubeSats
Satellites of Japan
Amateur radio satellites